Juan Cruz Bolado (born 22 July 1997) is an Argentine professional footballer who plays as a goalkeeper for Deportivo Maipú.

Club career
Cruz Bolado made his professional debut with Godoy Cruz in a 2-1 Argentine Primera División loss to Independiente on 9 November 2019.

In February 2021, Bolado joined Primera Nacional side Deportivo Maipú.

References

External links

1997 births
Living people
Sportspeople from Mendoza, Argentina
Argentine footballers
Association football goalkeepers
Argentine Primera División players
Primera Nacional players
Godoy Cruz Antonio Tomba footballers
Deportivo Maipú players